Montory is a commune in the Pyrénées-Atlantiques department in south-western France.

It is located in the historical province of Soule.

See also
Communes of the Pyrénées-Atlantiques department

References

External links

 MONTORI in the Bernardo Estornés Lasa - Auñamendi Encyclopedia (Euskomedia Fundazioa) (in Spanish)
  L'association "Vivons notre Village - Montory" (French & some English)

Communes of Pyrénées-Atlantiques
Pyrénées-Atlantiques communes articles needing translation from French Wikipedia